Marshall Thornton is an American writer of gay and lesbian mysteries best known for his Boystown series. He's won the Lambda Literary Award for Gay Mystery thrice and has been a finalist for the award six times. He's also been a finalist for the Lambda Literary Award for Gay Romance twice and placed second for the Rainbow Award for Gay Romantic Comedy in 2016.

Biography 
Thornton was born in Pittsburgh, Pennsylvania, then lived in the Adirondack Mountains as a teenager. He lived in Chicago for seven years before moving to Los Angeles, where he still lives.

He received a Master of Fine Arts in Screenwriting from the University of California, Los Angeles.

Awards

Publications 

 The Christmas Visit (2008)
 The Beneficiary (2009)
 Coffee Clutch (2009)
 Simple Addition (2009)
 Bartholi's Rest (2010)
 Coyote Bluff (2010)
 Lucky is Lost (2010)
 Desert Run (2011)
 Full Release (2011)
 The Ghost Slept Over (2014)
 My Favorite Uncle (2014)
 Snowman With Benefits (2014)
 Aunt Belle's Time Travel & Collectibles (2017)
 Never Rest (2018)
 Code Name: Liberty (2019)
 Fathers of the Bride (2021)

Boystown series 
The following books are listed in story order, not publishing order:

 Little Boy Dead (2012)
 Little Boy Afraid (2017)
 Three Nick Nowak Mysteries (2009)
 Three More Nick Nowak Mysteries (2010)
 Two Nick Nowak Novellas (2011)
 A Time For Secrets (2012)
 Murder Book (2013)
 From the Ashes (2013)
 Bloodlines (2015)
 The Lies That Bind (2016)
 Lucky Days (2017)
 Gifts Given (2017)
 Heart's Desire (2018)
 Broken Cord (2019)
 Fade Out (2020)

The Perils of Praline series 

 The Perils of Praline: Or, the Amorous Adventures of a Southern Gentleman in Hollywood (2010)
 Praline Goes To Washington: Or, the Erotic Misdeeds of a Newly Native Californian in Our Nation's Capitol (2017)

Jan Birch Mysteries series 

 The Development: Three Jan Birch Mysteries (2011)
 Mountain View Terrace (2011)

Femme series 

 Femme (2016)
 Masc (2018)

A Pinx Video Mystery series 

 Night Drop (2017)
 Hidden Treasures (2018)
 Late Fees (2018)
 Rewind (2019)
 Cash Out (2020)

The Wyandot County Mysteries series 

 The Less Than Spectacular Times of Henry Milch (2020)
 A Fabulously Unfabulous Summer for Henry Milch (2022)

Dom Reilly Mysteries series 

 Year of the Rat (2021)
 A Mean Season (2022)

References

External links 

 Official website

Living people
Writers from Pittsburgh
University of California, Los Angeles alumni
Lambda Literary Award winners
Year of birth missing (living people)